Marco Baldan (born 13 November 1993) is an Italian footballer who plays as a defender for Serie D club Brindisi.

Club career
He made his Serie C debut for Nocerina on 2 September 2012 in a game against Andria BAT.

On 8 July 2019, he joined Arezzo.

On 1 February 2021, he moved to Pistoiese.

On 17 August 2021, he joined Lucchese.

References

External links
 
 

1993 births
Living people
People from Cittadella
Sportspeople from the Province of Padua
Footballers from Veneto
Italian footballers
Association football defenders
Serie B players
Serie C players
Serie D players
A.C. Milan players
A.S.G. Nocerina players
Latina Calcio 1932 players
A.C. Perugia Calcio players
F.C. Lumezzane V.G.Z. A.S.D. players
F.C. Südtirol players
Arzachena Academy Costa Smeralda players
S.S. Arezzo players
U.S. Pistoiese 1921 players
Lucchese 1905 players
S.S.D. Città di Brindisi players